The Jacksonville Jaguars are a professional American football team based in Jacksonville, Florida. The Jaguars compete in the National Football League (NFL) as a member club of the American Football Conference (AFC) South Division. The team plays its home games at TIAA Bank Field. 

Founded alongside the Carolina Panthers in 1995 as an expansion team, the Jaguars competed in the AFC Central until they were moved to the AFC South in 2002. The franchise is owned by Shahid Khan, who bought the team from its original majority owner Wayne Weaver in 2012.

The Jaguars saw early success, making the playoffs in each of their second through fifth seasons, a four-year span in which they won two division titles and appeared in two AFC Championship Games. They are the youngest NFL expansion team to appear in a conference championship (by their second season in 1996, along with the Panthers) and clinch their conference's top seed (by their fifth season in 1999). The Jaguars have been less successful since, with only four playoff appearances and two division titles since 2000. Jacksonville is one of four NFL franchises that have never played in the Super Bowl, alongside the Cleveland Browns, Detroit Lions, and division rival Houston Texans.

Franchise history

Logos and uniforms

Logos

The day after the NFL awarded the expansion team to Jacksonville, Jaguars owner Wayne Weaver held up the Jaguars' proposed silver helmet and teal jersey at the NFL owners' meeting in Chicago. The team's colors were to be teal, gold, and silver with black accents. However, this jersey and helmet design, with a gold leaping jaguar, created controversy. Ford Motor Company, then-parent of the automaker Jaguar, believed that the Jaguars' logo bore too much resemblance to the automaker's logo. Though no lawsuit was brought to trial, lawyers from the team and the automaker negotiated an ultimately amicable agreement whereby Jaguar would be named the official car of the Jaguars, and the Jaguars would redesign their uniforms.

The new logo was a snarling jaguar head with a teal tongue, which Weaver said was his wife's touch. He also claimed that the teal tongue came from "feeding Panthers to our Jaguars" — an obvious jab at their expansion brethren. During the Jaguars' first-ever preseason game teal-colored candies were handed out to all the fans who attended, turning their tongues a teal color just like on the logo. Additionally, raspberry lollipops were handed out by the "Candy Man" in section 142 to also turn the home fans' tongues teal.

In 2009, Weaver announced that he wanted to "clean up" the team's image. This meant the elimination of the full-body crawling Jaguar logo, the clawing Jaguar, and the two previous wordmarks which bent the text around these logos.

In February 2013, Jaguars owner Shahid Khan, who had acquired the team in late 2011, introduced a new brand identity for the team that included a new logo, wordmark, and secondary logo. The new Jaguar head logo was intended to be "fiercer" and more realistic. The secondary logo incorporated the new Jaguar head logo along with the first official usage of the team's popular nickname "Jags". The two images were encased in a shield-style shape, designed to be a tribute to Jacksonville's military community.

Beginning in 2013, the Jaguars began to feature gold more prominently than in the past. From 2009 to 2012, gold had only been used in the team logo and as a minor accent color.

Uniforms

For most of their history, the Jaguars have done what many other NFL teams located in subtropical climates traditionally practice: wear their white jerseys at home during the first half of the season — forcing opponents to wear their dark ones under the sweltering autumns in Jacksonville. The only exceptions were in 2004 and 2008–2010, when the Jaguars chose to wear teal for all home games. In the preseason, the Jaguars typically wear teal at home, since these games are played at night when there is very little advantage with the heat.

1995–2001

Following the logo change, the redesigned uniforms featured an all-black helmet, white pants with teal, black, and gold stripes, and numbers with gold inner trim and black outer trim.  The home jersey was teal with white numbers and the away jersey was white with teal numbers. Both jerseys had a black collar and no sleeve stripes.

A prowling jaguar on each sleeve replaced the leaping jaguar going across both shoulders in the original design. The Jaguars in 1995 were the first NFL team to have two-tone borders on their numbers and lettering, and the first NFL team to show a complex logo (the crawling jaguar) on the sleeve.

Minor modifications were introduced to the Jaguars uniform during this time, most notably the font of the jersey numbers, replacing the original block numbers with a unique font. Two stripes were also added to the end of the sleeves below the prowling jaguar.

2002–2008

The team introduced a black alternate jersey in 2002. During that same year, the team also introduced alternate black pants, worn with either the white or the teal jersey. After the black pants were introduced, the white pants would only be seen for the first few games of the year, presumably due to the heat. The black pants originally included two teal stripes down each side. The fan reaction to the extra black in the alternate jersey and alternate pants was positive, so in 2004 the Jaguars went through a formal uniform change, which teams are only allowed to do once every five years. These changes were mostly to the away look. Before 2004, the white away jerseys had teal numbers with black and gold trim, but after, the white jerseys had black numbers with teal and gold trim. The black pants were also changed. The teal stripes were replaced with the jaguar logo on each hip. Teal almost disappeared from the away uniform.

The stripes on the white pants were altered in 2008 so that the center, thickest stripe was black, and its accents were teal. In the 2008 year, the gold in the uniforms noticeably shifted from a bright yellow metallic appearance to more beige.

2009–2012

The Jaguars unveiled new uniforms for the 2009 season. Team owner Wayne Weaver reportedly wanted to "clean up" the look, feeling that the team had too many uniform styles. The new uniforms were introduced in a press conference on April 22.

At this press conference, Weaver elaborated that different people had taken different liberties with the Jaguars' image over the years, singling out the "all black" look which the team wore for every prime-time home game from 2003 to 2007 as a point of regret.  He also said that the team would wear their teal jerseys at home even on hot days, saying that the practice of choosing to wear white on hot days had also diluted the team's image. The new uniform reflected a simpler look overall. The collar and sleeve ends are the same color as the rest of the jersey. The crawling jaguar was removed. The numbers on the jerseys were changed to a simpler, block font with a thicker, single color border. After all of these subtractions, two features were added. The first was a "Jaguars" wordmark underneath the NFL insignia on the chest. The second was two thin "stripes" of off-color fabric which were added to each midseam of the jersey, curling up to the neckline on the front and below the number on the back. The stripe on the home jersey is a white line next to a black line, matching the color of the numbers, and the stripe on the away jersey is a black line next to a teal line, again matching the numbers. The pants have similar stripes, both for the home and away uniform. The away uniforms were still black pants and numbers on a white jersey, but they now used teal as the only accent color as opposed to using gold in previous years. The Jaguars' identity, in terms of colors, beginning in 2009 is exclusively teal and black, with gold only being used in the logo. The final change made to the Jaguars' uniforms in 2009 was to the helmet. The new helmet and facemask were black just like the old ones, but when light hit the new ones a certain way, both the helmet and face mask sparkled with a shiny teal appearance. These were the first helmets in professional football which changed color with different angles of light. The logo and number decals also incorporated this effect.

Prior to the 2012 season, new Jaguars owner Shahid Khan announced that the team would once again use a black jersey, something they had not done since 2008. In September of that year, the team announced that it would use the black jersey and black pants as their primary home uniform. The teal jersey was resurrected as an alternate.

2013–2017

On April 23, 2013, the Jaguars unveiled new uniforms designed by Nike. The primary home jersey is black with white numerals outlined in teal and gold. The road jersey is white with teal numerals outlined in black and gold, marking the first time since 2003 that the team has used teal numbers on their road jersey. The alternate jersey is teal with black numerals outlined in white and gold. The team had never before used black numbers on their teal jersey. All three jerseys feature a contrasting stripe that bends around the neck, and semi-glossy patches on the shoulders meant to resemble claw marks. The team added their new shield logo onto a patch just above the player's heart, meant to pay tribute to Jacksonville's military heritage.

The helmet, first of its kind in the NFL, featured a glossy gold finish in the back that fades to matte black in the front, via a color gradient.

The new uniform set includes black and white pants with the Jaguars logo on the hip and a tri-color pattern down the player's leg.

In November 2015, as one of eight teams participating in Nike's "Color Rush" initiative for four games of Thursday Night Football during the 2015 season, Jacksonville introduced an all-gold second alternative uniform. The set features a gold jersey with black sleeves and black trim, as well as all gold pants. The white front and back numbers are lined in the teal accent color and bordered by black. The TV numbers on the shoulders are white with black bordering. The set also features gold undershirts and socks.

2018–present
On April 19, 2018, the Jaguars again revealed re-designed uniforms.  The new design returns to an all-black gloss helmet and removes many of the complicated details from the previous set.  For the first time, there are no borders at all on any of the jersey numbers.  There are no stripes or team logo on the pants; only an NFL logo and a Nike logo, which is the first and only of its kind in the NFL.  Like the 2009 uniform set, the only gold in the uniform set belongs to the jaguar logo itself, and the block number font is not distinct from that used by other teams. The sleeve trim and collar trim are both a different color than the rest of the jersey, that and the solitary jaguar logo are the only distinct markings on the jersey.  For the first time, the sock has a teal stripe between the black and white.  The black jersey is the primary, as it has been since 2012, and the teal is the alternate. The Jaguars continued to pair the uniforms with either black or white pants, but added alternate teal pants for the first time.

In 2019, the Jaguars began wearing either solid black or white socks as part of a new NFL mandate allowing solid-colored hosiery on the field.

In week three of the 2020 season against the Miami Dolphins, the Jaguars wore an all-teal ensemble for the first time, complete with solid teal socks.

On February 17, 2021, the Jaguars officially announced that the club would return to wearing teal jerseys as its designated primary home jersey color.

Stadium

TIAA Bank Field (formerly known as Jacksonville Municipal Stadium, Alltel Stadium, and EverBank Field) is located on the north bank of the St. Johns River, and has been the home of the Jaguars since the team's first season in 1995. The stadium has a capacity of 69,132, with additional seating added during Florida–Georgia Game and the Gator Bowl.

The stadium served as the site of Super Bowl XXXIX in addition to four Jaguar playoff games including the 1999 AFC Championship Game.  It also hosted the ACC Championship Game from 2005 to 2007 and the River City Showdown in 2007 and 2008.

From 1995 to 1997 and again from 2006 to 2009, the stadium was named Jacksonville Municipal Stadium.  From 1997 to 2006, the stadium was referred to as Alltel Stadium. The naming rights were purchased by EverBank prior to the 2010 season. Prior to the 2018 season the Jaguars announced the stadium would be renamed TIAA Bank Field.

The stadium received a substantial upgrade in 2014 with the addition of new scoreboards, pools, cabana seating and premium seating that includes 180 field-level seats. The new scoreboards at TIAA Bank Field are now the world's largest video boards. Two  by  pools were installed in the north end zone along with the cabana seating. The cost of the stadium upgrades were $63 million, of which owner Shahid Khan helped finance $20 million.

Rivals

The Jaguars share rivalries with the other three teams in the AFC South: the Indianapolis Colts, Houston Texans, and Tennessee Titans.

Divisional rivalries

Tennessee Titans 

During the 1995 season, the Jaguars recorded their first win as a franchise over the Oilers in Houston. The rivalry intensified in the late 1990s as both teams were consistently near the top of the AFC Central standings. In , the Jaguars posted a 14–2 record with both losses coming to Tennessee. The two teams met in the AFC Championship Game, with Tennessee beating Jacksonville for a third time that season, 33–14. The Titans lead the overall series, 33–21, having also won the only playoff game in the series.

The Jaguars also have geographic rivalries with the two other Florida-based teams: the Miami Dolphins and Tampa Bay Buccaneers. The Jaguars, Dolphins, and Buccaneers frequently play each other during the preseason. During the AFC Central days of the mid-1990s and early 2000s, the Jaguars had a rivalry with the Pittsburgh Steelers as the two teams were consistently in playoff contention. The rivalry would reach new heights in the 2000s and 2010s when the Jaguars and Steelers joined the AFC South and North respectively.

Statistics and records

Season-by-season results
This is a partial list of the Jaguars' last five completed seasons. For the full season-by-season franchise results, see List of Jacksonville Jaguars seasons.

Note: The Finish, Wins, Losses, and Ties columns list regular season results and exclude any postseason play.

As of January 14, 2021

Current roster

Players of note

Retired numbers

On October 9, 2022, the Jacksonville Jaguars officially retired Tony Boselli's number 71, at a halftime ceremony against the division-rival Houston Texans. It is the first number retired by the organization.

Pride of the Jaguars
A contest was held in July 2006 to name the club's ring of honor as "Pride of the Jaguars" was chosen with 36% of the vote. It was unveiled during the 2006 season during a game against the New York Jets on October 8. Former offensive tackle Tony Boselli was the first player inducted.

On January 1, 2012, team owner Wayne Weaver and his wife Delores were added to the Pride of the Jaguars in their final game before the sale of the team to Shahid Khan. On June 7, 2012, the Jaguars announced Fred Taylor would be the next inductee into the Pride of the Jaguars. He was officially inducted on September 30, 2012. Longtime Jaguars quarterback Mark Brunell was also inducted into the "Pride of the Jaguars" on December 15, 2013. The most recent addition was WR Jimmy Smith, inducted in 2016.

Florida Sports Hall of Fame

All-time first-round draft picks

Pro Football Hall of Fame

Head coaches and coordinators

Head coaches

The Jaguars have had nine head coaches (including two interim coaches) throughout their franchise history. Their first head coach was Tom Coughlin, who compiled a 72–64 (.529) overall record with the team from 1995 to 2002. Jack Del Rio was the longest-tenured head coach in Jaguars history, holding the position from 2003 to 2011. The current head coach is Doug Pederson, who was hired on February 3, 2022, and is the ninth head coach in franchise history.

Offensive coordinators

Defensive coordinators

Current staff

Culture

Mascot

Since his introduction in 1996, Jaxson de Ville has served as the Jaguars' mascot.  Jaxson entertains the crowd before and during games with his antics.  The mascot has established a reputation for making dramatic entrances including bungee jumping off the stadium lights, sliding down a rope from the scoreboard, and parachuting into the stadium.

Jaxson's antics got him into trouble in 1998 and stemmed the changing of the NFL's mascot rules, and also caused him to calm down. However, Jaxson was still seen, by some, as a mascot that gets in the way during the game. After the October 22, 2007 game against Indianapolis, Colts President Bill Polian complained to the NFL, and Jaxson was reprimanded again.

Jaxson's first appearance was on August 18, 1996, and was played by Curtis Dvorak from his inception until his retirement in June 2015.

Jacksonville Roar

The Jacksonville Roar is the professional cheerleading squad of the Jaguars. The group was established in 1995, the team's inaugural year, and regularly performs choreographed routines during the team's home contests.

In addition to performing at games and pep rallies, members function as goodwill ambassadors of the team, participating in corporate, community, and charitable events in the Jacksonville metropolitan area where they sign autographs and pose for pictures. They also join NFL tours to entertain American servicemen and women around the world.

Community work

The Jacksonville Jaguars Foundation was established in 1994, when the franchise deal was first announced. Since then, the Foundation has given over $20 million to area efforts in community improvement. The Foundation focuses on many initiatives, such as Honor Rows, anti-tobacco programs, NFL Play 60, and support for veterans. The Foundation grants over $1 million annually to organizations that assist "economically and socially disadvantaged youth and families".

The Jaguars' first head coach, Tom Coughlin, established the Tom Coughlin Jay Fund Foundation in 1996 to help young cancer victims and their families with emotional and financial assistance. The charity remained in Jacksonville after Coughlin left to coach the New York Giants.

Broadcast media

Radio

From their inaugural 1995 season until 2013, the Jaguars' flagship radio station was WOKV, which simulcasts on both AM 690 and on 104.5 FM.

Starting with the 2014 season, the team moved their broadcast to WJXL and WJXL-FM (1010 AM and 92.5 FM) and simulcast on 99.9 Gator Country

Frank Frangie is the play-by-play announcer with former Jaguars players Tony Boselli and Jeff Lageman providing color analysis.

Television
WJAX-TV or WFOX-TV televises all preseason games and also televises regular season games that are televised nationally on ESPN or NFL Network.

See also
 List of Jacksonville Jaguars seasons
 Cultural significance of the jaguar in North America

Notes and references

External links

 
 Jacksonville Jaguars at the National Football League official website

 
National Football League teams
1993 establishments in Florida
American football teams established in 1995
American football teams in Florida
American football teams in Jacksonville, Florida
Companies based in Jacksonville, Florida
Events in Jacksonville, Florida